The 2009 South American Rugby Championship "B" was the 10th second tier of national Rugby Union teams in South America.

The tournament was played in Costa Rica, outside South America, but the hosts were given a place and the right to organize the tournament.

Colombia won the tournament.

Ranking
{| class="wikitable"
|-
!width=165|Team
!width=40|Played
!width=40|Won
!width=40|Drawn
!width=40|Lost
!width=40|For
!width=40|Against
!width=40|Difference
!width=40|Points
|- align=center
|align=left| 
|3||3||0||0||115||13||+102||9
|- align=center
|align=left| 
|3||2||0||1||68||55||+13||7
|- align=center
|align=left| 
|3||1||0||2||70||66||+4||5
|- align=center
|align=left| 
|3||0||0||3||19||138||−119||3
|}

Matches

Related pages
2009 South American Rugby Championship "B"

Sources
http://www.rugbydata.com/

2009
2009 rugby union tournaments for national teams
B
rugby union
rugby union
rugby union
rugby union
International rugby union competitions hosted by Costa Rica

it:Campionato sudamericano di rugby 2009
pt:Campeonato Sul-Americano de Rugby de 2009